Frank Mücklich (born August 17, 1959) is a German materials scientist. He is professor at Saarland University and leads the Chair of Functional Materials.

Biography 
Frank Mücklich was born in Dresden, Germany. He grew up in Freiberg where he attended the Geschwister-Scholl-Gymnasium. From 1980 to 1985, Mücklich studied Physical Metallurgy and Materials Science at the Freiberg University of Mining and Technology. In 1988, he received his PhD with a dissertation on 'X-ray diffraction analysis of point defects in highly perfect Gallium arsenide single crystals' at the Heinrich Oettel Institute. As postdoctoral researcher he stayed at the University of Technology in Freiberg where he headed the metallography working group at the Institute of Physical Metallurgy.

In 1990, Mücklich went on a Max Planck scholarship to the Max Planck Institute for Metals Research in Stuttgart led by Günter Petzow and became group leader for functional materials. Five years later, he was appointed professor at Saarland University and built up the Chair of Functional Materials. In 2008, he founded the European School of Materials and, in 2009, the Material Engineering Center Saarland as a research center of the Steinbeis Foundation.

Scientific contributions 
Mücklich works in the areas of surface structuring and material characterization. His focus is on surfaces and thin films exploring new possibilities of material functionalisation mainly by pulsed laser beams, as well as thin film phenomena and electrical erosion. His research concerns the three-dimensional microstructure of materials at micro-, nano- and atomic-scale. He works scale-dependent with various experimental and theoretical methods. Together with the mathematician Joachim Ohser he described the theoretical background of his research in the book Statistical Analysis of Microstructures in Materials Science.

Honors 
 1994: Georg Masing Memorial Prize of the German Society for Materials Science
 1997: Alfried Krupp Prize for Young University Teachers of the Alfried Krupp von Bohlen und Halbach Foundation
 2007: Werner Köster Award of the German Society for Materials Science (together with Claus Daniel and Andrés Lasagni)
 2008: Roland Mitsche Prize of ASMET Austria and the German Society for Materials Science
 2010: Werner Köster Award of the German Society for Materials Science (together with Alexandra Velichko)
 2012: Löhn Award, transfer prize of the Steinbeis Foundation
 2013: Copper innovation prize of the German Copper Institute
 2016: Henry Clifton Sorby Award of ASM International
 2016: Berthold Leibinger Innovationspreis
 2018: Full member of the German Academy of Science and Engineering (acatech)
 2018: Fellow of the American Society for Materials
2018: President (Science) of the German Materials Society (DGM)

References

External links and sources
Chair for Functional Materials at Saarland University
Material Engineering Center Saarland (MECS)
European School of Materials (EUSMAT)
Google Scholar Profile
Berthold Leibinger Innovationspreis award video

1959 births
German materials scientists
Living people
Academic staff of Saarland University
Scientists from Dresden